La Calera may refer to:

Places
Argentina
La Calera, Córdoba
La Calera, San Luis
La Calera, Tucumán
Colombia
La Calera, Cundinamarca 
Chile
La Calera, Chile
La Calera (oasis), a small oasis and orchard in the Atacama Desert of Chile.
Mexico
La Calera Airport
Spain
La Calera, Cáceres, a village part of Alía municipality

Sports
Unión La Calera, Chilean football club

See also
Calera (disambiguation)